Sulfur dichloride is the chemical compound with the formula . This cherry-red liquid is the simplest sulfur chloride and one of the most common, and it is used as a precursor to organosulfur compounds. It is a highly corrosive and toxic substance, and it reacts on contact with water to form chlorine-containing acids.

Chlorination of sulfur
 is produced by the chlorination of either elemental sulfur or disulfur dichloride. The process occurs in a series of steps, some of which are:
; ΔH = −58.2 kJ/mol
; ΔH = −40.6 kJ/mol
It is likely that several  exist where n > 2.

Pure samples may be stored in sealed glass ampules which develop a slight positive pressure of chlorine, halting the decomposition.

 is used In organic synthesis. It adds to alkenes to give chloride-substituted thioethers. Illustrative is its addition to 1,5-cyclooctadiene to give a bicyclic thioether A well tested method for the production of the mustard gas bis(2-chloroethyl)sulfide, is the addition of ethylene to sulfur dichloride:

 is also a precursor to several inorganic sulfur compounds. Treatment with fluoride salts gives  via the decomposition of the intermediate sulfur difluoride.

One example is di-t-butylsulfurdiimide.

Safety considerations
 hydrolyzes with release of HCl. Old samples contain .

References

Sulfur chlorides
Sulfur(II) compounds